Peter Meer from Rutgers University, Piscataway, NJ was named Fellow of the Institute of Electrical and Electronics Engineers (IEEE) in 2012 for contributions to mean-shift and robust techniques in computer vision.

References

External links
 Rutgers  Peter Meer

Fellow Members of the IEEE
Living people
Year of birth missing (living people)
Place of birth missing (living people)
Rutgers University faculty
American electrical engineers